Ohel Theatre (Teat'ron 'Ohel) was a Hebrew-language theatre company, active between 1925–1969 in Mandate Palestine and Israel .

History

Ohel (Hebrew for "tent"), originally known as the Workers' Theatre of Palestine, was established in 1925 as a socialist theatre: members of the company combined acting with farming and industrial labour. The theatre, founded by Moshe Halevy, who had been a founding member of Habimah in Moscow, was organised as a collective.

The theatre's first production was a Hebrew adaptation of stories by the Yiddish writer I. L. Peretz. Peretz's Parties depicted the decadence of life in the Diaspora, compared to new Jewish life in the Land of Israel. In 1927, it staged Dayagim ("Fishermen"), a socialist play about the exploitation of fishermen by entrepreneurs.

Set designers who worked with the company in its early years were European-trained painters and architects, among them architect Aryeh Elhanani, expressionist painter Israel Paldi and Menachem Shemi, a painter of the Paris school, as well as other important artists such as Reuven Rubin and Arie Aroch.
 
On a successful European tour in 1934, Ohel staged biblical and national plays. When the company returned to Palestine, it produced The Good Soldier Schweik (1935), one of its most successful offerings. In 1961, Ohel staged a comedy by Ephraim Kishon, Ha-Ketubbah ("The Marriage Contract"), which played for three seasons.

Until 1958, Ohel was the official theatre of the Histadrut, the General Labor Federation.

In 1964, under a new artistic director, Canadian-born Peter Frye, the company performed Ammekha by Scholem Aleichem, plays by Ionesco, Brecht, and young British playwrights. The theatre closed in 1969.

See also
Culture of Israel

References

External links
Vision Hospitality: Ohel Theater

Jewish theatres
Theatre companies in Israel
Israeli culture